"Chirpy Chirpy, Cheep Cheep" is a song recorded in 1970 by its composer Lally Stott, and made popular in 1971 by Scottish band Middle of the Road for whom it was a UK #1 chart hit. That version is one of fewer than fifty singles ever to have sold in excess of 10 million physical copies worldwide.

History
The original recording of the song by Lally Stott was first released in September 1970 in Italy, where he had been living for several years. It was a hit, becoming a top-twenty hit at the beginning of October. However, the record company, Philips, was reluctant to release the song overseas, and apparently offered it to two other groups: Scottish folk-pop group Middle of the Road, who were working in Italy at the time, and the Trinidadian brother-and-sister duo Mac and Katie Kissoon. Philips did eventually release Stott's version elsewhere and it topped the charts in Australia and Zimbabwe, as well as being a top-ten hit in South Africa. It was also a minor hit in the US, peaking at number 92 on the Billboard Hot 100, something that Middle of the Road never achieved.

Middle of the Road released their version in October 1970 in Italy, though it failed to chart there. It was released in the UK on 15 January 1971 and initially became a hit in continental Europe only, before later growing in popularity in the UK. It entered the UK Singles Chart in the final week of May and reportedly got a boost from DJ Tony Blackburn, who favoured this version over the one by Mac and Katie Kissoon (which had recently been released), and topped the charts three weeks later for five weeks. Mac and Katie Kissoon's version, released in May 1971, had the most success in North America, peaking at number 20 on the Billboard Hot 100 and number 10 on the Canadian RPM chart.

At the time, the song was dismissed by critics as bubblegum, a view initially held by band leader Ken Andrew: "We were as disgusted with the thought of recording it as most people were at the thought of buying it. But at the end of the day, we liked it."

In 2006 "Chirpy Chirpy Cheep Cheep" topped a list of unintentionally creepy songs in The Observer. Despite its popular appeal and popular chorus, the song has a theme of child abandonment.

Appearances
The song was featured on the Top of the Pops, Volume 18 album.

In popular culture
The song was sampled in the Denim song "Middle of the Road" on their 1992 album, Back in Denim.

The song's title has sometimes been parodied:
 "Chirpy Burpy Cheap Sheep", a 1998 episode of the Irish sitcom Father Ted.
 "Slurpy Slurpy Sleep Sleep", a song on Scottish band Biffy Clyro's 2022 album, The Myth of the Happily Ever After.

Included on the soundtrack in The Guard (2011) performed by Middle of the Road.

The character Frank Gallagher references the Middle of the Road version in an episode of the UK TV series, Shameless

Included on the soundtrack of the Shudder exclusive film, "The Power" (2021), which takes place in 1974 London.

Charts

Lally Stott version

Weekly charts

Year-end charts

Middle of the Road version

Weekly charts

Year-end charts

Mac and Katie Kissoon version
Weekly charts

References

1970 singles
1971 singles
UK Singles Chart number-one singles
Number-one singles in Australia
Number-one singles in Norway
Number-one singles in Spain
Number-one singles in Switzerland
Number-one singles in Zimbabwe
Irish Singles Chart number-one singles
Middle of the Road songs
Schlager songs
1970 songs